The M. Young Botanic Garden  is a botanical garden located at 14178 West Kearney, Kerman, California, United States. Every plant used is drought-tolerant.  One section contains Southwestern native trees, shrubs and ground covers. Another will include 12 different gardens with a water-conservation theme, some with paths, arbors, patios and seating areas.

See also
 List of botanical gardens in the United States

References

Botanical gardens in California
Protected areas of Fresno County, California